Al-Amjūd is a sub-district located in the Shar'ab as-Salam District, Taiz Governorate, Yemen. Al-Amjūd had a population of 18,322 according to the 2004 census.

Villages
Wadiha Al-suflaa(lower Wadiha) village. 
Al-jabiruh village.
Wadiha Al-'ulya(upper Wadiha) village.
Banī Abdallah al-Suflaa(lower Banī Abdallah) village.
Al-a'ruq village.
Al-afrad village.
Banī Qasim village.
Al-madaqah village.
Tabasha' village.
Banī Salah village.
Al-sana' village.
Banī Abdallah Al-'ulya(upper Banī Abdullah) village.
Nsf Banī Almujidi village.

References

Sub-districts in Shar'ab as-Salam District